"I Wanna Dance Wit' Choo (Doo Dat Dance)" is a song written by Bob Crewe and Denny Randell and performed by Disco-Tex and the Sex-O-Lettes.   The song was featured on their 1975 album, Disco Tex & His Sex-O-Lettes Review.
The song was produced by Bob Crewe and arranged by Denny Randell.

Chart history
In 1975, it reached #3 on the US Disco chart, #6 on the UK Singles Chart, #7 on the US Dance chart, #23 on the Billboard Hot 100, #25 in Canada, #33 on the US R&B chart, and #100 in Australia.

References

1975 songs
1975 singles
Songs written by Bob Crewe
Songs written by Denny Randell
Disco-Tex and the Sex-O-Lettes songs
Song recordings produced by Bob Crewe